Fiddle Me This may refer to:

 "Fiddle Me This", a 1995 season 3 TV episode of Kidsongs
 "Fiddle Me This" (Amphibia), an episode of Amphibia
 "Fiddle Me This", a 2015 song by Yelawolf from the album Love Story

See also

 Riddle Me This (disambiguation)